The New Bedford-Fairhaven Bridge is a swing truss bridge which connects New Bedford, Massachusetts with Fairhaven, Massachusetts.

Between New Bedford and Fairhaven
The bridge is actually one of three bridges crossing the Acushnet River between the two communities. The entire four lane stretch carries U.S. Route 6 between the two communities. A short,  span crosses between the mainland of New Bedford just west of McArthur Drive to Fish Island, the smaller western island in the river. From there, after a  stretch of highway connects the two spans, the main New Bedford-Fairhaven Bridge crosses from Fish Island to Pope's Island. This span includes the main span (see below). Once on Pope's Island, another  stretch of highway connects to the third and longest span, a low,  trestle bridge between Pope's Island and the town of Fairhaven, with the town line falling on the bridge.

The main span
While many maps include all three spans as one "New Bedford-Fairhaven Bridge", only the middle span between the two is the actual bridge. This span, which was built between 1897 and 1899, is the one which includes the  swing truss across the main channel into the northern half of the harbor. The bridge still opens on a regular basis, with daily openings to allow the fishing fleet in and out of the inner harbor.

The bridge has been repaired numerous times in its lifetime, though there are occasional closings due to jammed gears.

Major rehabilitation

In 2022, a $100 million planning study was funded by the Massachusetts Department of Transportation to determine how the antiquated bridge might be replaced, and as of 2022 public meetings have been held to gain input on the needs of the region in replacing the structure.

See also
List of bridges documented by the Historic American Engineering Record in Massachusetts

References

External links

Buildings and structures in New Bedford, Massachusetts
Bridges in Bristol County, Massachusetts
Road bridges in Massachusetts
U.S. Route 6
Bridges of the United States Numbered Highway System
Historic American Engineering Record in Massachusetts
Steel bridges in the United States
1900 establishments in Massachusetts